Przywidz  (Kashubian: Przëwidz) is a village in Gdańsk County, Pomeranian Voivodeship, in northern Poland. It is the seat of the gmina (administrative district) called Gmina Przywidz.

The village has a population of 1,673.

References

Przywidz